Abram Baldwin Olin (September 21, 1808 – July 7, 1879) was a United States representative from New York and an Associate Justice of the Supreme Court of the District of Columbia.

Early life
Olin was born on September 21, 1808, in Shaftsbury, Bennington County, Vermont, Olin was a youngers son of Gideon Olin, a United States representative from Vermont, and his second wife, Lydia Myres Pope Olin. He was the cousin of Henry Olin, also a United States Representative from Vermont.

Olin attended the common schools, then graduated from Williams College in Williamstown, Massachusetts in 1835, and read law in 1838.

Career
He was admitted to the bar and entered private practice in Troy, New York from 1838 to 1856. He was city recorder for Troy from 1844 to 1852.

Congressional service

Olin was elected as a Republican from New York's 13th congressional district to the United States House of Representatives of the 35th, 36th and 37th United States Congresses, serving from March 4, 1857, to March 3, 1863.

Federal judicial service

Olin was nominated by President Abraham Lincoln on March 10, 1863, to the Supreme Court of the District of Columbia (now the United States District Court for the District of Columbia), to a new Associate Justice seat authorized by 12 Stat. 762. He was confirmed by the United States Senate on March 11, 1863, and received his commission the same day. His service terminated on January 13, 1879, due to his retirement. He was succeeded by Alexander Burton Hagner.

Personal life

After being ill for several weeks, Olin died on July 7, 1879, at his residence near Sligo in Montgomery County, Maryland (now part of Silver Spring). He was interred in the Danforth family lot adjacent to West Lawn Cemetery in Williamstown, Berkshire County, Massachusetts.

References

External links 

 

1808 births
1879 deaths
Williams College alumni
New York (state) lawyers
Judges of the United States District Court for the District of Columbia
United States federal judges appointed by Abraham Lincoln
19th-century American judges
Republican Party members of the United States House of Representatives from New York (state)
19th-century American politicians